Rodrigo Paixão Mesquita (born March 4, 1985), known as Rodrigo Paulista, is a Brazilian footballer who plays as an attacking midfielder.

Rodrigo Paulista played for Figueirense and Internacional in the Campeonato Brasileiro, and also spent a football career in Shenyang Dongjin and Anhui Jiufang in the second division of the Chinese football league.

Honours
 '''Campeonato Gaúcho: 2003, 2004, 2005.

References

External links
Rodrigo Paulista at Soccerway

1985 births
Living people
Brazilian footballers
Sport Club Internacional players
Figueirense FC players
América Futebol Clube (RN) players
Grêmio Barueri Futebol players
Sociedade Esportiva e Recreativa Caxias do Sul players
Guarani FC players
Shenyang Dongjin players
Anhui Jiufang players
Zhejiang Yiteng F.C. players
Guizhou F.C. players
Chinese Super League players
China League One players
Expatriate footballers in China
Brazilian expatriate sportspeople in China
Association football midfielders
Footballers from São Paulo